Mobile enterprise asset management (or mobile EAM) refers to the mobile extension of work processes for maintenance, operations and repair of corporate or public-entity physical assets, equipment, buildings and grounds. It involves management of work orders (planned, break/fix or service requests) via communication between a mobilized workforce and computer systems to maintain an organization's facilities, structures and other assets.

The idea behind mobile EAM as a business practice is that it enables remote workers – employees who spend part or all of their time away from a central office – access to data from the organization's computer application software for enterprise asset management (commonly referred to as an enterprise system, EAM system or backend system), typically using a handheld or other mobile computer. This is to distinguish from the term mobile asset management, which refers more broadly to the actual tools, instruments and containers organizations use to track and secure equipment and other such assets frequently on the move.

In the mobile EAM process, the organization eliminates a need for paper forms or other data reporting and communication methods (push-to-talk and radio) to move work order information to and from the point where the work is being performed.

While enterprise asset management encompasses the management of an organization's entire asset portfolio across processes including equipment addition/ reduction, replacement, over-hauling, redundancy setup and maintenance budgets, mobile enterprise asset management is focused, by definition, strictly on the wireless automation of asset management data for such processes.

Mobile EAM technology 

When viewed and used on a handheld device, mobile work order applications provide details such as location, stepwise job plans, safety alerts, lock-outs and prior work history on the asset, giving a maintenance technician or other remote worker more detailed asset information as well as the ability to transmit work data to the organization's enterprise system when completed – through a wireless network, docking station or other synchronization method.

Using computer software to achieve standard mobile EAM practices, organizations often report such advantages as an increase in timely, accurate data flow between their remote workers and central management such as planners and schedulers, which thereby improves capital and labor allocation decision processes (including an ability to schedule more planned/preventive maintenance work).  
 
With the proliferation of smartphone and other mobile computing technologies, asset managers can expect an ever more tech-savvy workforce, lower costs in mobile devices and a higher propensity of feature-rich, workflow-specific mobile applications.

Challenges 
Nearly all challenges in mobile EAM practices can be traced to two factors: time and labor resources (including IT or information technology management) and investment costs.

Developing and implementing a mobile application architecture on the enterprise scale is not an easy undertaking by any means, as mobile applications are faced with a diversity of device operating systems, output media (voice and data) and connectivity methods, contrasting with a PC (personal computer) environment where in most cases software requires relatively few, if major, updates and lower upfront costs. Organizations looking to implement mobile EAM applications often seek the help of technology consulting firms and spend months researching, planning and selecting an implementation strategy.

Industries using mobile EAM 
The use of mobile enterprise application platforms (MEAPs), designed around service-oriented architecture principles for multiple systems integration and custom modification, and other forms of wireless computing technology for mobile EAM solutions is growing rapidly, particularly in industries where physical assets form a significant cost proportion of organizations’ total assets. These industries can include:
 
 Facilities management
 Utilities
 Life sciences
 Government organizations
 Manufacturing
 Oil and gas industry
 Transportation industry

In such high-value asset scenarios, the asset lifecycle improvements introduced by the increase in enterprise data flow of mobile EAM processes can bring significant savings, particularly when part of an enterprise-wide capital and labor management strategy that integrates multiple systems in an enterprise architecture (EAM system, mobile EAM application, labor dispatch / scheduling software, GIS, etc.).

Market growth 
In a 2009 study, market analyst Gartner, Inc. forecasted, “for the MEAP and packaged mobile application market…we now expect market growth annually of 15 to 20% through 2013.” Gartner attributes this anticipated growth to enterprises’ increasing willingness (and ability) to extend decision-relevant information to employees, who are themselves increasingly mobile.

For EAM practices as a whole, this means that an increasing proportion of organizations in capital-intensive industry sectors (such as those above) are adopting mobile technology as an integral part of their enterprise asset management strategy – corresponding with an enterprise-wide emphasis on whole life planning, life cycle costing, planned and proactive maintenance and other industry best practices.

References

See also 
enterprise asset management
mobile device
enterprise system
work order

Product lifecycle management
Enterprise architecture
Mobile technology
Business software
Asset management
Management by type